Thomas C. Hayden was an American football coach.  He was the head football coach at McPherson College in McPherson, Kansas from 1940 to 1946, compiling a record of 8–22–3.  Hayden had previously worked as an assistant coach at Coe College.

Head coaching record

References

Year of birth missing
Year of death missing
Coe Kohawks baseball coaches
Coe Kohawks football coaches
Coe Kohawks men's basketball coaches
McPherson Bulldogs football coaches